Warren T. Furutani (born October 16, 1947) is an American politician who served in the California State Assembly from 2008 to 2012. He is a Democrat and a fourth-generation Japanese American. Furutani was elected in a special election in 2008. He replaced Laura Richardson in California's 55th State Assembly district. Prior to being elected, he served on the Los Angeles Unified School District and then the Los Angeles Community College District Board of Trustees. He was the first Asian Pacific American ever elected to the LAUSD in 1987 and became the board's president in 1991.

Education
Furutani graduated from Gardena High School in 1965. He attended several community colleges and earned a B.A. degree from Antioch University.

Activism
During the mid-1960s, Furutani became more politically minded due to the social climate of the nation at the time, in large part because of his own family's history. He became a civil rights activist and became involved in what were to become the early stages of the Asian American Movement. Furutani worked tirelessly to establish admissions programs for students of color at colleges and universities throughout the United States. He helped many campuses establish ethnic studies programs and was instrumental in UCLA and Long Beach State University adopting an Asian American Studies program.

Early career
He was one of 150 people to make the first organized pilgrimage to Manzanar in December 1969.

In 1970, Warren helped to create the Manzanar Committee that worked to get Manzanar designated as a national historical site.

Career
Prior to being elected to the Assembly, he served on the Los Angeles Unified School District and then the Los Angeles Community College District Board of Trustees. In 1987, he became the first Asian Pacific American ever elected to the LAUSD and was the board's president in 1991. Furutani was elected in a special election in 2008 to the California State Assembly. He replaced Laura Richardson, who won a special election to replace Juanita Millender-McDonald as the member of the US House of Representatives from California's 37th district. He served until 2012 and did not run for re-election after that.

Electoral history

Controversy 
On June 15, 2011, during an Assembly debate on a redevelopment bill, Assemblyman Donald Wagner remarked that the bill was like something he had "seen on The Sopranos" and likened the author of the bill to Tony Soprano. After Assemblyman Anthony Portantino told Wagner to apologize for the remarks, Wagner replied that he would "apologize to any Italian-American who is NOT in the Mafia or involved in insurance scams". Within seconds, a verbal confrontation erupted on the Assembly floor between Wagner and Furutani and the two had to be separated.

Personal life
He and his wife, Lisa, are residents of Gardena, California.

References

External links 
 Campaign website
 "Warren Furutani" by Karen Inouye, Densho Encyclopedia
 Join California Warren Furutani

1947 births
Living people
American politicians of Japanese descent
California politicians of Japanese descent
Antioch University alumni
Democratic Party members of the California State Assembly
People from Gardena, California
School board members in California
21st-century American politicians
Gardena High School alumni